Brendon Valença Sobral (born 10 May 2002), simply known as Brendon, is a Brazilian footballer who plays as a midfielder for Botafogo, on loan from Resende.

Club career
Born in São Paulo, Brendon played for eight years at Corinthians' youth categories. In 2020, after leaving the club, he joined Resende.

Brendon made his first team debut for Resende on 19 March 2021, coming on as a second-half substitute in a 1–4 Campeonato Carioca away loss against Flamengo. He then returned to the under-20s, but impressed during the 2022 Copa São Paulo de Futebol Júnior and was promoted back to the first team on 20 January 2022.

Regularly used during the 2022 Campeonato Carioca, Brendon moved on loan to Botafogo on 11 April 2022, initially assigned to the under-20 squad.

Career statistics

References

2002 births
Living people
Footballers from São Paulo
Brazilian footballers
Association football midfielders
Resende Futebol Clube players